Aroura may refer to:

 Arura, an Homeric word for earth, land
 Aroura (Xenakis), a 1971 composition for strings by Iannis Xenakis
 Bani Zeid al-Sharqiya, a Palestinian village
 Aroura, an Ancient Greek unit of area

See also
Aurora (disambiguation)